BMI may refer to:

Companies and organizations
 BMI Foundation, founded by Broadcast Music Incorporated
 BMI Healthcare, UK
 BMI Film & TV Awards
 BMI Research, a research firm
 Flybmi airline, formerly BMI Regional and a BMI mainline subsidiary
 Bmibaby.com, former airline, BMI subsidiary
 British Midland International, a UK airline incorporated into BA
 Baltimore Museum of Industry
 Bank of Makati, a Philippine bank
 Bank Melli Iran, the first national Iranian bank
 Best Motoring International, a Japanese magazine
 Birmingham and Midland Institute, England
 Broadcast Music, Inc., a collecting society for composers' copyrights
 Bundesministerium des Innern, the German Federal Ministry of the Interior
 Bureau of Military Information, US Civil War agency

Other
 Body mass index of weight in relation to height
 BMI Awards, annual award ceremonies for songwriters
 Bit Manipulation Instruction Sets for x86 microprocessors
 Brain Machine Interface
 Central Illinois Regional Airport, IATA code

See also